The Charles H. Wright Museum of African American History, or The Wright, is located in Detroit, Michigan in the U.S.; inside the city's Midtown Cultural Center is one of the world's oldest independent African American museums.

Founded in 1965, The Wright museum holds the world's largest permanent collection of African-American culture. With a collection of more than 35,000 artifacts, The Wright's current 125,000-square-foot museum opened as the largest museum in the world dedicated to African American history.

The Wright, whose exhibits include Underground Railroad documents and letters from Malcolm X and Rosa Parks, also hosted memorial events for Parks and the "Queen of Soul," Aretha Franklin, who lay in state in the museum's rotunda in 2005 and 2018, respectively.

Notably, The Wright is the current home of The National Museum of the Tuskegee Airmen The Wright also produces one of the largest festivals dedicated to celebrating the food, fashion, music, and dance cultures of the diaspora -- African World Festival.

History

International Afro-American Museum (1965) 
Charles H. Wright, a Detroit-based obstetrician and gynecologist, felt inspired to create a repository for African-American history after he visited a memorial to World War II heroes in Denmark during the mid-twentieth century.

"I was committed to what I defined as 'one of the most important tasks of our times,'" Dr. Wright would later remark, "ensuring that generations, especially young African Americans, are made aware of and take pride in the history of their forebears and their remarkable struggle for freedom."

Wright would eventually create the International Afro-American Museum (IAM) in 1965 and the doors opened in January 1966. The IAM was located on 1549 West Grand Boulevard in a house owned by Dr. Wright. 
The IAM featured galleries of African art and instruments, a collection of inventions by African Americans, and an exhibition on Civil Rights activists. Some of the exhibits included the inventions of Michigan native Elijah McCoy, and masks from Nigeria and Ghana that Dr. Wright had acquired while visiting there. Wright also opened a traveling exhibit to tour the state.

Museum of African American History (1985) 
In 1978, the city of Detroit leased the museum a plot of land in Midtown near the Detroit Public Library, the Detroit Institute of Art, and the Detroit Science Center. Groundbreaking for a new museum occurred on  May 21, 1985.

Two years later, the doors of the new 28,000-square-foot Museum of African American History were opened to the public at 301 Frederick Street.

Charles H. Wright Museum of African American History (1997)
Once again the museum outgrew its facility and city leaders began developing ideas for a larger new museum. In 1992, Detroit voters authorized the City of Detroit to sell construction bonds to finance a larger building, and ground was broken for the third generation of the Museum in August 1993.

In 1997, Detroit architects Sims-Varner & Associates (now SDG Associates) designed a new 125,000 square foot (11,000 m2) facility on Warren Avenue, the museum's current location. In 1999, Christy S. Coleman became president and CEO of the museum, establishing a $12 million core exhibit.

The Wright Museum is a nonprofit institution and has dual missions, serving as both a museum of artifacts and a place of cultural retention and growth.

Collections and exhibits
Home to the Blanche Coggin Underground Railroad Collection, the Harriet Tubman Museum Collection, and the Sheffield Collection (which details the labor movement in Detroit), The Wright houses more than 35,000 artifacts pertaining to the African American experience. Some of the permanent exhibits and displays include:

And Still We Rise: Our Journey through African American History and Culture
And Still We Rise is a permanent exhibit for The Wright that offers a comprehensive look at the history of African-American resilience. The two-story interactive journey takes guests from African kingdoms and the tragedy of the Middle Passage, to the heroism of the Civil Rights Movement and beyond.

Ring of Genealogy (Ford Freedom Rotunda Floor)
Located under The Wright's world-famous dome is master muralist Hubert Massey's 72-foot mural on the circular rotunda floor entitled "Genealogy." It was inspired by the struggle of African Americans for freedom, education, economic empowerment, and social equality. High-end terrazzo, marble chips, and cement were used to create the ornate flooring.

Wall
A wall of the museum has the museum's official poem, "This Museum Was Once a Dream," written by Melba Boyd, inscribed in bronze.

Education & Events
The Wright offers a range of public programs and educational opportunities for young audiences including historical reenactments, interpretive tours of exhibitions, seminars, summer camps, workshops, and more.

African World Festival
Launched in 1983 in Hart Plaza, African World Festival (AWF) moved to the grounds of The Wright in 2012. AWF, the museum's largest public outreach program, is a family-friendly event that welcomes more than 150,000 people over a three-day weekend in August. It is one of the largest cultural festivals in the Midwest dedicated to celebrating the histories and cultures of the Diaspora. The event was canceled in 2020 due to COVID-19 restrictions. In 2021, the event will resume as a hybrid event with in-person and virtual events. The Wright reportedly envisions returning the festival back to Hart Plaza.

Juneteenth
Juneteenth is the oldest nationally celebrated commemoration of the ending of slavery in the United States. In 2021, days after President Joe Biden signed a law making Juneteenth, June 19, a federal holiday, the museum presented a hybrid virtual and in-person three-day celebration.

Kwanzaa Celebration
Kwanzaa is celebrated from December 26 through January 1. Each year, The Wright uses daily programming with songs and dances, storytelling, poetry reading, and more to mark the occasion.

Camp Africa
From science and technology to engineering, mathematics, and the arts—Camp Africa is a free, week-long summer day camp open to children ages 7 – 12. Campers explore and celebrate the accomplishments of individuals in a variety of fields and careers across the African Diaspora.

Building Highlights

Ford Freedom Rotunda
The Ford Freedom Rotunda features a glass dome that is larger than the Michigan State Capitol dome. It measures 100 feet in diameter by 55 feet high glass dome; making it two feet wider than the State Capitol dome. Flags of the 92 nations represented in African-American history adorn the upper level of the rotunda, while the Ring of Genealogy, a 37-foot terrazzo tile creation featuring bronze nameplates of prominent African Americans in history, is on the ground level.

General Motors Theater
The General Motors Theater is a recently renovated 317-seat facility that serves to host lectures, concerts, film screenings, presentations, seminars, and workshops.

Ripple of Impact
In response to severe flooding that impacted Detroit in August 2014, The Wright collaborated with neighboring institution Michigan Science Center to build and manage stormwater diversion equipment on Warren Avenue. This sustainability initiative helps The Wright effectively manage nearly 190,000 gallons of stormwater each year through this diversion system. , and has been responsible for removing 50,000 gallons of stormwater permanently from the sewer system overall.

The development of green stormwater infrastructure projects, like the newly renovated bioswale and urban gardens, helps prevent pollution to the Detroit River, beautify the cultural campus, and teach students and visitors about land and water preservation & sustainability.

See also 

History of the African-Americans in Metro Detroit
List of museums focused on African Americans
(Detroit) Cultural Center Historic District 
Detroit Historical Museum
Detroit Institute of Arts
Detroit Science Center

References

External links

Wright Museum website
African World Festival

1965 establishments in Michigan
African-American history in Detroit
African-American museums in Michigan
Midtown Detroit
Museums established in 1965
Museums in Detroit